Ange Mercie Jean Baptiste (born 24 September 1984) is a Haitian judoka who has participated internationally for Haiti. She won the silver medal at the Judo competitions of the 2006 Central American and Caribbean Games. She was one of seven athletes who represented Haiti at the 2008 Summer Olympics in Beijing. A photograph of Baptiste in her match against Yurisleydis Lupetey of Cuba at Beijing, which depicted a drop of blood falling from Baptiste's forehead and hitting the ground during the match, won an award at the World Press Photo Contest in 2009.

References

1984 births
Living people
Olympic judoka of Haiti
Judoka at the 2008 Summer Olympics
Haitian female judoka

Central American and Caribbean Games silver medalists for Haiti
Competitors at the 2006 Central American and Caribbean Games
Competitors at the 2010 Central American and Caribbean Games
Central American and Caribbean Games medalists in judo
20th-century Haitian women
21st-century Haitian women